Defending champions Alfie Hewett and Gordon Reid defeated Stéphane Houdet and Nicolas Peifer in the final, 6–7(5–7), 7–5, 7–6(7–3) to win the gentlemen's doubles wheelchair tennis title at the 2017 Wimbledon Championships.

Seeds

  Stéphane Houdet /  Nicolas Peifer (final)
  Alfie Hewett /  Gordon Reid (champions)

Draw

Finals

References
WC Men's Doubles

Men's Wheelchair Doubles
Wimbledon Championship by year – Wheelchair men's doubles